Saru Get You: SaruSaru Big Mission (Japanese name: サルゲッチュ　サルサル大作戦 Sarugetchu: Saru Saru Daisakusen) is a video game in the Ape Escape series released in Japan for the PlayStation Portable system.

Plot
After kidnapping The Professor, Aki, Sayaka, Satoru and Hikaru, Specter goes on to shrink the laboratory with Kakeru and Natsumi still inside. On the bright side, the lab is now the perfect size to be disguised as a Pipo Helmet - Natsumi and Kakeru can use this to take control over monkeys (or Piposaru in Japan) to help rescue their friends and defeat Specter once again.

Gameplay
Unlike other stand-alone titles in the series such as Pipo Saru 2001 and Ape Escape: Pumped & Primed, the game borrows heavily from Ape Escape 3. The same graphic engine is used, which is a first for Ape Escape, as usually all games' graphics are re-created for each game. 
In a different approach to the normal gameplay, SaruSaru Big Mission has the player controlling the Pipo Helmet shaped lab. By latching it onto a monkey, they can gain control of it, including any abilities it may have. If the monkey takes too much damage, they will lose control of it. The aim is to utilize the monkeys' abilities to reach the end of the level safely.

References

External links 
Official site for Saru Saru Daisakusen

2007 video games
Ape Escape games
H.a.n.d. games
Japan-exclusive video games
PlayStation Portable games
PlayStation Portable-only games
Single-player video games
Sony Interactive Entertainment games
Video games about size change
Video games developed in Japan